This is a following list of Indian Bengali films released by West Bengal film Industry.

January–March

April–June

July–September

October–December

References

2017 in Indian cinema
Bengali-language films
2017